Praça Sete de Setembro (Sete de Setembro Square) normally called Praça Sete, is a square inside Belo Horizonte, Minas Gerais, Brazil, in the center of the city's downtown. It's located at the intersection of two major avenues, Afonso Pena and Amazonas, and by the streets Rio de Janeiro and Carijós.

It boasts an obelisk at its center donated by the people of the neighboring Capela Nova do Betim, today the city of Betim, the inhabitants of the state capital, on the occasion of the commemoration of the centenary of the Independence of Brazil, on September 7, 1822. The "Lollipop", as it is known, is made of granite and formed by a 7m needle supported over a square pedestal adorned by a pole in each of its vertices. It was designed by architect Antonio Rego and built by engineer Antonio Gonçalves Gravatá.
history.

Gallery

See also 
 Belo Horizonte

References 

 

Sete de Setembro
Parks in Brazil